In Korea, high school baseball (고등학교 야구) is played at a very high level by students who train year round. Unlike in Japan or the U.S. where nearly every high school fields a team, there are only about 60-70 Korean high school baseball teams which makes the competition tantamount to an all-star league of Korea's young talent. KBO, MLB and NPB scouts are frequently in attendance at all of the five national high school baseball tournaments.

Competitions

Five major national tournaments
The five Big 5 tournaments are the most important high school baseball events of the year in terms of tradition, prize-money awarded, and public attention.

National tournaments hosted by local cities
There used to be four lower-level high school baseball events of the year sponsored by local cities.  However, these local tournaments have been replaced with the High School Weekend League after the 2010 season.

See also
Baseball in Korea
Baseball awards#South Korea
Baseball awards#U.S. high-school baseball
Japanese High School Baseball Championship (Summer Koshien)
National High School Baseball Invitational Tournament championship (Spring Koshien)

References

External links
Korea Baseball Association (KBA)

Baseball in South Korea
South Korea